The Boy Who Plays on the Buddhas of Bamiyan is a 2004 documentary film, directed by British film maker Phil Grabsky and released on 6 March 2004 in USA.

Plot summary

This film takes place over four seasons and follows Hazara refugees living in squalor.  The refugees, including an eight-year-old boy, are living with the legacy of the Taliban and military interventions.

For over 25 years, Afghanistan has been at war. Over two million civilians have been killed. In March 2001, the ruling Taliban destroyed the tallest stone statues in the world, the ‘Buddhas of Bamiyan’.

Over the course of a year, this film follows the story of one of the refugees who now lives in a cave among the ruins…an 8-year-old boy called Mir.

British film-maker Phil Grabsky travelled alone to central Afghanistan a few months after the fall of the Taliban.

References

External links

 

2004 documentary films
2004 films
British documentary films
Documentary films about Afghanistan
2000s English-language films
2000s British films